Chenna Dam, is an earthfill dam on Chenna river near Gadchiroli in state of Maharashtra in India.

Specifications

Purpose
 Irrigation

See also
 Dams in Maharashtra
 List of reservoirs and dams in India

References

Dams in Maharashtra
Year of establishment missing